The women's 100 metres T63 event at the 2020 Summer Paralympics in Tokyo, took place on 4 September 2021.

Records
Prior to the competition, the existing records were as follows:

Results

Heats
Heat 1 took place on 4 September 2021, at 11:02:

Heat 2 took place on 4 September 2021, at 11:08:

Final
The final took place on 4 September 2021, at 21:26:

References

Women's 100 metres T63
2021 in women's athletics